The 2020 Moneta Czech Open was a professional tennis tournament played on clay courts. It was the 27th edition of the tournament which was part of the 2020 ATP Challenger Tour. It took place in Prostějov, Czech Republic between 7–13 September 2020.

Singles main-draw entrants

Seeds

 1 Rankings are as of 31 August 2020.

Other entrants
The following players received wildcards into the singles main draw:
  Zdeněk Kolář
  Jiří Lehečka
  Dalibor Svrčina

The following players received entry into the singles main draw as special exempts:
  Tallon Griekspoor
  Aslan Karatsev

The following players received entry from the qualifying draw:
  Frederico Ferreira Silva
  Filip Horanský
  Roman Safiullin
  Aleksandar Vukic

The following players received entry as lucky losers:
  Dmitry Popko
  Lukáš Rosol

Champions

Singles

  Kamil Majchrzak def.  Pablo Andújar 6–2, 7–6(7–5).

Doubles

  Zdeněk Kolář /  Lukáš Rosol def.  Sriram Balaji /  Divij Sharan 6–2, 2–6, [10–6].

References

External links
 Official website

2020 ATP Challenger Tour
2020
2020 in Czech tennis
September 2020 sports events in the Czech Republic